The 2020 Humpty's Champions Cup was scheduled to be held from April 29 to May 3, at the Olds Sportsplex in Olds, Alberta. On March 12, 2020, the event was cancelled due to the COVID-19 pandemic.

The teams that qualified were originally invited to play in the 2021 Champions Cup, providing that three quarters of their team stays intact. However, the 2021 event was changed so that the top 12 teams in the World were invited instead.

Qualified teams

Men

Women

Men's Teams
The teams are listed as follows:

Women's Teams
The teams are listed as follows:

References

External links

2020
Champions Cup
Champions Cup
Champions Cup
Curling competitions in Alberta
Curling events cancelled due to the COVID-19 pandemic